After the Fog is a 1929 drama film directed by Leander De Cordova and starring Mary Philbin, Edmund Burns and Carmelita Geraghty. It was an early sound film, made during the transition from silent films. A separate silent version was also produced. It was the final film of star Philbin.

Synopsis
Joshua Barker and his family have tended a lighthouse for generations, and he wants his daughter Faith to remain in the area and marry a local fisherman. However she dreams of a more exciting life and is won over when a socialite arrives in a yacht. She marries him and this sends her father over the edge, leading him to attack her with an axe.

Cast
 Mary Philbin as Faith Barker
 Edmund Burns as John Temple
 Carmelita Geraghty as Winifred Blake
 Russell Simpson as Joshua Barker
 Margaret Seddon as Letitia Barker
 Allan Simpson as Phil Langhorne
 Joseph Bennett as Bill Reynolds

References

Bibliography
 Munden, Kenneth White. The American Film Institute Catalog of Motion Pictures Produced in the United States, Part 1. University of California Press, 1997.

External links
 

1929 films
1929 drama films
1920s English-language films
American black-and-white films
Films directed by Leander de Cordova
1920s American films